Jacques-Émile Blanche (1 January 1861 – 30 September 1942) was a French artist, largely self-taught, who became a successful portrait painter, working in London and Paris.

Early life

Blanche was born in Paris. His father, whose name he shared, was a successful psychiatrist who ran a fashionable clinic, and he was brought up in the rich Parisian neighborhood of Passy in a house that had belonged to the Princesse de Lamballe.

Career
Although Blanche received some instruction in painting from Henri Gervex, he may be regarded as self-taught. He became a very successful portrait painter, with a style derived from 18th-century English painters such as Thomas Gainsborough as well as Édouard Manet and John Singer Sargent. He worked in London, where he spent time from 1870 on, as well as Paris, where he exhibited at the Salon and the Société Nationale des Beaux-Arts.  One of his closest friends was Marcel Proust, who helped edit several of Blanche's publications. He also knew Henry James and is mentioned in Gertrude Stein's The Autobiography of Alice B. Toklas.

In 1902, Jacques-Émile Blanche took over the direction of the Académie de La Palette, where he would remain director until 1911.
He taught at the Académie Vitti in 1903.

Among the painter's most famous works are portraits of his father, Marcel Proust (private collection, Paris), the poet Pierre Louÿs, the Thaulow family (Musée d'Orsay, Paris), Aubrey Beardsley (National Portrait Gallery, London), and Yvette Guilbert and the infamous beauty Virginia Oldoini, Countess of Castiglione whom his father had treated for mental illness. Others he painted included James Joyce, Julia Stephen, Edgar Degas, Claude Debussy, Auguste Rodin, Colette, Thomas Hardy, John Singer Sargent, Charles Conder, Percy Grainger, and Tamara Karsavina as Stravinsky's Firebird.

Personal life

Blanche was well-known in Parisian society to be homosexual, though closeted. After the Oscar Wilde trials he married Rose Lemoinne, the daughter of the publisher and editor of the influential Parisian newspaper Journal des Débats, but the marriage was never consummated. One of his lovers may have been the Spanish painter Rafael de Ochoa, whom Blanche wrote shared the "same tendencies", and features with him in a self-portrait. 
Blanche died at his home in Offranville-en-Caux, Normandy, France on 30 September 1942.

Published works
He was the author of the unreliable Portraits of a Lifetime: the late Victorian era: the Edwardian pageant: 1870–1914 (London: J.M. Dent, 1937) and More Portraits of a Lifetime, 1918–1938 (London:  J.M. Dent, 1939), about which Walter Sickert said "he is liable to twist things he hears or doesn't into monstrous fibs".

Selected paintings

References

External links
 
 
 
 Jacques Emile Blanche: The Biggest Anglophile of the French Painters
 

1861 births
1942 deaths
Painters from Paris
19th-century French painters
19th-century French male artists
20th-century French painters
20th-century French male artists
French portrait painters
19th-century French engravers
20th-century French engravers
19th-century French male writers
20th-century French non-fiction writers
French male painters
Members of the Ligue de la patrie française
Art educators